The 2022 NBA All-Star Game was an exhibition game played on February 20, 2022, during the National Basketball Association's 2021–22 season. It was the 71st edition of the NBA All-Star Game. The game was hosted by the Cleveland Cavaliers at Rocket Mortgage FieldHouse. This was the third time that the Cleveland area hosted the All-Star Game, the first being in 1981 at the Coliseum in nearby Richfield, Ohio, and most recently in 1997—three years after the Cavaliers moved back to downtown Cleveland to play in the newly built Gund Arena, which is now known as Rocket Mortgage FieldHouse. Coincidentally, on the occasion Cleveland hosted an All-Star Game, the NBA celebrated its 35th season (1981), 50th anniversary (1997), and 75th anniversary (2022). The announcement of the site selection was made on November 1, 2018, at a press conference held by the Cleveland Cavaliers.

With teams captained by LeBron James and Kevin Durant, Team LeBron won the game 163–160. Team LeBron's Stephen Curry, who scored 50 points, set the record for most three-pointers made in an All-Star quarter (6), half (8), and game (16), and was also named the All-Star Game Kobe Bryant Most Valuable Player. This was Team LeBron's fifth consecutive All-Star win.

All-Star Game

Coaches

Monty Williams, coach of the Phoenix Suns, qualified as the head coach of Team LeBron on January 30. Erik Spoelstra, coach of the Miami Heat, qualified as the head coach of Team Durant on February 6.

Rosters
As had been the case in previous years, the rosters for the All-Star Game were selected through a voting process. The fans could vote through the NBA website and the NBA App. The starters were chosen by the fans, media, and current NBA players. Fans made up 50% of the vote, and NBA players and media each comprised 25% of the vote. The two guards and three frontcourt players who received the highest cumulative vote totals in each conferences were named the All-Star starters and two players in each conferences with the highest votes were named team captains. NBA head coaches voted for the reserves for their respective conferences, none of which could be players from their own team. Each coach selected two guards, three frontcourt players and two wild cards, with each selected player ranked in order of preference within each category. If a multi-position player was to be selected, coaches were encouraged to vote for the player at the position that was "most advantageous for the All-Star team", regardless of where the player was listed on the All-Star ballot or the position he was listed in box scores.

The All-Star Game starters were announced on January 27, 2022. Trae Young of the Atlanta Hawks and DeMar DeRozan of the Chicago Bulls were named the backcourt starters in the East, earning their second and fifth all-star appearances, respectively. Kevin Durant of the Brooklyn Nets and Giannis Antetokounmpo of the Milwaukee Bucks were named the frontcourt starters in the East, earning their 12th and sixth all-star appearances, respectively. Joining in the East frontcourt was Joel Embiid of the Philadelphia 76ers, his fifth selection.

Ja Morant of the Memphis Grizzlies and Stephen Curry of the Golden State Warriors were named to the starting backcourt in the West, earning their first and eighth all-star appearances, respectively. In the frontcourt, Andrew Wiggins of the Golden State Warriors and LeBron James of the Los Angeles Lakers were named to their first and 18th all-star selections, respectively. Joining them was reigning MVP Nikola Jokić of the Denver Nuggets, in his fourth all-star selection. Wiggins was the third first-time All-Star to be voted a starter in his eighth season or later. He also became the first No. 1 overall draft pick in the modern draft era (since 1966) to earn their first All-Star selection in their eighth season or later.

The All-Star Game reserves were announced on February 3, 2022. The West reserves included Devin Booker of the Phoenix Suns, his third selection (and first as a non-replacement player); Luka Dončić of the Dallas Mavericks, his third selection; Rudy Gobert of the Utah Jazz, his third selection; Draymond Green of the Golden State Warriors, his fourth selection; Donovan Mitchell of the Utah Jazz, his third selection; Chris Paul of the Phoenix Suns, his 12th selection; and Karl-Anthony Towns of the Minnesota Timberwolves, his third selection.

The East reserves included Jimmy Butler of the Miami Heat, his sixth selection; Darius Garland of the Cleveland Cavaliers, his first selection; James Harden of the Philadelphia 76ers, his tenth selection; Zach LaVine of the Chicago Bulls, his second selection; Khris Middleton of the Milwaukee Bucks, his third selection; Jayson Tatum of the Boston Celtics, his third selection; Fred VanVleet of the Toronto Raptors, his first selection; and Jarrett Allen of the Cleveland Cavaliers, his first selection, as an injury replacement for James Harden.

 Notes
Italics indicates leading vote-getters per conference.

 Kevin Durant was unable to play due to a knee injury.
 LaMelo Ball was selected as Kevin Durant's replacement.
 Draymond Green was unable to play due to a lower disc injury.
 Dejounte Murray was selected as Draymond Green's replacement.
 Jayson Tatum was selected to start in place of Durant.
 James Harden was unable to play due to a hamstring injury, but was present for the halftime ceremony.
 Jarrett Allen was selected as James Harden's replacement.

Draft
The NBA-All Star draft took place on February 10, 2022. LeBron James and Kevin Durant were named captains for the second straight year, as they both received the most votes from the West and East, respectively. The first eight players to be drafted were starters. The next 14 players, chosen by NBA head coaches (seven from each conference), were then drafted. NBA Commissioner Adam Silver selected replacements for any player unable to participate in the All-Star Game, choosing a player from the same conference as the player who was being replaced. Silver's selection joined the team that drafted the replaced player. If a replaced player is a starter, the head coach of that team would choose a new starter from their cast of players. James picked Giannis Antetokounmpo with his first pick, and Durant picked Joel Embiid second. Team Durant was the home team due to the Eastern Conference having home team status for the game.

Lineups

Game

The 2022 All-Star Game used the same format as the 2020 edition; the team that scores the most points during each of the first three 12-minute quarters received a cash prize, which was donated to a designated charity; the pot would roll over if the teams are tied. The fourth quarter was untimed under the rules of the Elam Ending, in which the first team to meet or exceed a "target score"—the score of the leading team in total scoring after three quarters plus 24—was declared the winner.

After one quarter win each and a tie in the third quarter, LeBron James made a walk-off basket on a turnaround fadeaway jumper to win the game 163–160. Team LeBron's Stephen Curry won the NBA All-Star Game Kobe Bryant Most Valuable Player Award after scoring 50 points, two shy of Anthony Davis's record and 48 of which were made from three-pointers, and setting three-pointers record.

All-Star Weekend

Celebrity Game

NBA HBCU Classic 
A neutral site Mid-Eastern Athletic Conference (MEAC) college basketball game between the Howard Bison and Morgan State Bears was held on February 19, 2022, at the Wolstein Center as the inaugural NBA HBCU Classic. The NBA and AT&T donated $100,000 to each team's athletic department, and the game was simulcasted by NBA TV, TNT and ESPN2. Howard defeated Morgan State 68–66.

Rising Stars Challenge

Skills Challenge

The Skills Challenge took place on February 19. Team Rooks advanced to the finals after winning the third round and receiving 200 points in the round. Team Cavs defeated Team Rooks in the finals after Evan Mobley drilled a half-court shot.

Three-Point Contest

The Three-Point Contest took place on February 19. Towns won his first Three-Point Contest by defeating Trae Young and Luke Kennard. Towns set the record for most points in the final round with 29 surpassing Devin Booker who had 28 in 2018, becoming the first center to win the event and the first Timberwolves player since Kevin Love in 2012.

Slam Dunk Contest

The Slam Dunk Contest took place on February 19. Toppin won his first NBA Slam Dunk Contest by defeating Juan Toscano-Anderson in the finals. The contest was heavily criticized by analysts, players, and fans, with Dwyane Wade, who was calling the contest, describing it as "a solid six", which in the contest is the lowest score a dunk can receive.

Clorox Clutch Challenge
Tyrese Haliburton of the Indiana Pacers and Desmond Bane of the Memphis Grizzlies were the winners of the 2022 Clorox Clutch Challenge, an event for the 75th season at the 2022 NBA All-Star Weekend. The runner-up teams consisted of Chris Duarte and Scottie Barnes, Evan Mobley and Josh Giddey, as well as G-League players Michael Foster Jr. and Fanbo Zeng. Tyrese Maxey would end up replacing Duarte due to injury.

Broadcasting 
This is the first All-Star Game since 2000 (then aired on NBC) to not be called by Marv Albert, as he retired at the end of the 2020–21 NBA season. The game was televised nationally in the United States by TNT. Sister network TBS carried an alternate feed, Inside the All-Star Game, which featured a conversational presentation of the game featuring the Inside the NBA panel of Charles Barkley, Ernie Johnson, Shaquille O'Neal, and Kenny Smith, with guests such as Draymond Green. Coaches, referees, and selected players also wore microphones. 

In Canada, the game was televised nationally by Sportsnet.

Notes

References

External links
2022 NBA All-Star Game at nba.com

National Basketball Association All-Star Game
Basketball competitions in Cleveland
All-Star Game
NBA All-Star Game
2020s in Cleveland
2022 in sports in Ohio